USCGC Sundew (WLB-404) was a  sea going buoy tender (WLB). An Iris, or C-class tender, it was built by Marine Iron and Shipbuilding Corporation in Duluth, Minnesota, United States.  Sundews preliminary design was completed by the United States Lighthouse Service and the final design was produced by Marine Iron and Shipbuilding Corporation in Duluth for the U.S. Coast Guard. On 29 November 1943 the keel was laid. It was launched on 8 February 1944 and commissioned on 24 August 1944. The original cost for the hull and machinery was $861,589.

Sundew is one of 39 original  seagoing buoy tenders built between 1942-1944. All but one of the original tenders, were built in Duluth. Like all of these tenders, Sundew was named after a plant, in this case the sundew, a carnivorous plant from the genus Drosera.

Sundew was then moved to Duluth, Minnesota, where it served until it was retired in 2004.

Sundew served 60 years for the Coast Guard and was decommissioned and retired on May 27, 2004. As part of the decommissioning, the vessel was given to the city of Duluth, its last home port, to be used as a museum ship.

Due to a drop in tourism revenue, in 2009 the city of Duluth sold Sundew to local residents, Jeff and Toni Foster, David Johnson and Mary Phillipp. The Sundew moved from its museum location in Duluth in the spring of 2010, and currently (2021) occupies a private slip near Duluth's Great Lakes Aquarium.

External links 
Sundew - U.S. Coast Guard Cutter, WLB 404
National Park Service Report on the  buoy tenders
Photo history of USCG buoy tenders by the Coast Guard Historian's Office
Article Winter 2004 Article from North Star Port Magazine

Iris-class seagoing buoy tenders
1944 ships
Historic American Engineering Record in Minnesota
Museum ships in Minnesota
Ships built in Duluth, Minnesota